"" is a song by Italian singer Marco Mengoni, released by Sony Music on 8 February 2023. It was written by Mengoni with Davide Petrella and Davide Simonetta. Simonetta also produced the track together with E.D.D. The song was Mengoni's winning entry for the Sanremo Music Festival 2023, the 73rd edition of the Italian musical festival, which doubled as the selection of the Italian act for the Eurovision Song Contest 2023.

Background and composition 
Mengoni spoke about the meaning of the song:

Mengoni dwelt on the inspiration for the song, found in the figure of Italian singer-songwriter Lucio Dalla, explaining that:

The song also marks the singer's third participation at the Sanremo Music Festival after "Credimi ancora" in 2010 and "L'essenziale", winner of the Sanremo Music Festival 2013, with which he represented Italy at the Eurovision Song Contest 2013.

Reception 
The song was mostly well received by Italian critics. In its review of the Sanremo 2023 songs, Corriere della Sera gave "Due vite" an 8/10, describing the song as a "classic ballad" that "doses melody and rhythm well", where "thoughts chase each other". Also Valentina Colosimo from Vanity Fair states that the song "allows Mengoni to show off all his singing skills", bringing the viewer "a ton of feelings". Fabio Fiume from All Music Italia rated the song 7.5/10, writing the song is a "modern piece that respects both its vocal beauty and its best prerogatives to be personal". The Panorama critic Gabriele Antonucci gave the song a 8.5 rating, he praised Mengoni's performance as "masterful", with a perfect combination of "voice, words and arrangement". Less enthusiastic was the review by Francesco Prisco of Il Sole 24 Ore, assigning a score of 6-/10, writing that "Mengoni does Mengoni: the thing he does best", suggesting a lack of originality compared to his previous works.

Music video 
The music video for the song was directed by Roberto Ortu. The filming took place on the dunes of Piscinas in Sardinia.

Charts

Certifications

References

2023 singles
2023 songs
Marco Mengoni songs
Sanremo Music Festival songs
Number-one singles in Italy
Songs written by Davide Petrella
Songs written by Davide Simonetta
Sony Music singles
Eurovision songs of 2023
Eurovision songs of Italy